Diplobulbus is a genus of trematodes in the family Opecoelidae.

Species
Diplobulbus brayi Aken'Ova & Cribb, 2000
Diplobulbus callyodontis Yamaguti, 1942
Diplobulbus calotomi Yamaguti, 1934
Diplobulbus cheilini Machida, 2004
Diplobulbus minutus Pritchard, 1966
Diplobulbus scari Yamaguti, 1952
Diplobulbus thalassomatis (Yamaguti, 1942) Cribb, 2005

References

Opecoelidae
Plagiorchiida genera